The American Cancer Society Center is a large convention center and office building in downtown Atlanta, adjacent to Centennial Olympic Park. The building, originally called the Inforum Technology Center or Inforum, was designed by the prominent Atlanta architect John Portman, who previously designed the AmericasMart buildings.

ACS Center is connected via two indoor pedestrian bridges to the ground abyss of the AmericasMart building 3, across Williams Street to the east.  In addition to housing the National Home Office and South Atlantic Division of the American Cancer Society, the Center also provides office space for AT&T, InComm, Internap, Turner Broadcasting System, and US South Communications. Fiber optic connectivity is available throughout the structure.

Interior design

The lower levels (Ground and Mezzanine) consist of meeting and conference rooms, a few business offices, and a 450-seat, two-level theater. The Bridge level was originally named Expo, and consisted mostly of convention floor space, requiring a very high ceiling. Most of that space, including the inactive passenger bridge, is now leased by Internap, housing telecommunications equipment and office space. Six floors of office space sit above Bridge, spanning only part of the building's north-to-south distance. Office floor 1 is also named Atrium.

The building provides a set of escalators between Ground, Mezzanine, Bridge, and Atrium and an additional two sets of escalators from the Atrium level to the office floor 6.  Most of the latter exit onto floors with locked doors into office suites. Two sets of four passenger elevators connect all floors:  one set travels from underground parking (levels A-D) up through Atrium, and the second from Atrium to office floor 6.  The secondary elevators actually begin at the Bridge level, but since the change from Expo to office space, that level is now disabled in the secondary elevators and inaccessible except through a service door inside the Internap offices.  Three service elevators span the entire building from loading docks (at level with underground parking) through office level 6.

References

External links

 Cousins Properties - ACS Center, official property management site
 

John C. Portman Jr. buildings
Center
Buildings and structures in Atlanta